Hartland is a town in Windsor County, Vermont, United States. The population was 3,446 at the 2020 census. It includes the villages of Hartland, Hartland Four Corners, and North Hartland.

History 
Hartland, originally named Hertford, was chartered in 1761.

Geography
According to the United States Census Bureau, the town has a total area of 45.2 square miles (117.0 km2), of which 45.0 square miles (116.4 km2) is land and 0.2 square mile (0.6 km2) (0.53%) is water. The Connecticut River forms its eastern boundary, and the Ottauquechee River flows through the northern part of the town.

Demographics

As of the census of 2000, there were 3,223 people, 1,270 households, and 900 families living in the town.  The population density was 71.7 people per square mile (27.7/km2).  There were 1,382 housing units at an average density of 30.7 per square mile (11.9/km2).  The racial makeup of the town was 98.57% White, 0.12% African American, 0.16% Native American, 0.43% Asian, 0.06% Pacific Islander, 0.06% from other races, and 0.59% from two or more races. Hispanic or Latino of any race were 0.62% of the population.

There were 1,270 households, out of which 33.3% had children under the age of 18 living with them, 59.5% were married couples living together, 8.4% had a female householder with no husband present, and 29.1% were non-families. 22.0% of all households were made up of individuals, and 6.9% had someone living alone who was 65 years of age or older.  The average household size was 2.53 and the average family size was 2.97.

In the town, the population was spread out, with 26.1% under the age of 18, 5.1% from 18 to 24, 29.2% from 25 to 44, 27.9% from 45 to 64, and 11.8% who were 65 years of age or older.  The median age was 40 years. For every 100 females, there were 101.2 males.  For every 100 females age 18 and over, there were 93.7 males.

The median income for a household in the town was $49,388, and the median income for a family was $55,354. Males had a median income of $32,639 versus $26,691 for females. The per capita income for the town was $23,715.  About 1.3% of families and 2.6% of the population were below the poverty line, including 2.7% of those under age 18 and 1.0% of those age 65 or over.

Industry
The town was home to a J. E. Ashworth & Sons blanket mill. Originally the Sturtevant woolen-mills, it was operated by water-power, had five looms, employed twelve men, and made 10,000 blankets per year. The Ottaquechee Woolen Mills in North Hartland had 1,680 spindles, sixty looms, and 75 employees.

Notable people 

Victor Ambros, discoverer of miRNA, winner of many international awards, including Lasker Award, Breakthrough Prize, Gairdner Foundation International Award, Keio Medical Science Prize, Wolf Prize in Medicine
 Henry M. Bates, Vermont State Treasurer
 Downer T. Bramble, Dakota Territorial legislator
 Roger Enos, veteran of the French and Indian War and American Revolution who commanded the Vermont Militia in the later stages of the American Revolution
 George Seldes, investigative journalist and media critic
 Benjamin H. Steele, Associate Justice of the Vermont Supreme Court
 John C. Thompson, Justice of the Vermont Supreme Court
 George Tooker, figurative painter in the Magic realism and Social realism movements; recipient of the National Medal of Arts
 Miro Weinberger, current mayor of Burlington, Vermont
 Peter Welch,  U.S. Representative
 Daniel Willard, railroad executive

References

External links

 Town of Hartland official website
 Hartland Historical Society
 https://www.flickr.com/photos/dougtone/sets/72157624566828463/with/4877062753/
 History of the Town of Hartland, Vermont Collection, 1750–1950 at Dartmouth College Library

 
Towns in Vermont
Vermont populated places on the Connecticut River
Towns in Windsor County, Vermont